Bichi is a Local Government Area and a headquarter of Bichi Emirate council in Kano State, Nigeria. Its headquarters are in the town of Bichi on the A9 highway. Bichi was founded by danejawa the white herders under the leadership of Ardo buba the grandfather of Malam  danzabuwa

Danejawa

Danejawa is among the important clans of fulani tribe. Their ancestor was Muhammadu Danejo. They reared pure white cows. They migrated from Chad to Hausa land and settled in Shanono in Kano kingdom. Some members of the clan left Shanono to Bichi in the north west of Kano and took up the title of sarkin Bichi. Some moved to Kano city and established Daneji quarters near the palace of sarkin Kano, others moved to Kasar Katsina under the leadership of Gudundi assisted by his two younger brothers, Dudi and Gandi.

The Danejawa movement into Katsina was in late 18th century. They moved into Karaduwa-Bunsuru basin and settled at Papu with the title of sarkin fulani Daneji. They also established the town of Dangani.

Danejawa were the richest among all the fulani clans in Katsina and within themselves Gudundi was the richest with several thousands of Cows. Gudundi was arrested and humiliated by sarkin Maska Birgiji after accusing him of grazing in his farm; when the fulani jihad started in Katsina, Gudundi led his clan to attack Maska and killed sarki Birgiji. Gudundi became the first fulani Sarkin Maska.

Banaga Dan Bature one of the leaders of Zamfara rebels against Sokoto caliphate raided Maska and seized thousands of Cows belonging to Gudundi including his daughter. Several of his Cows were raided again by Muhammadu Yero, one of the freebooters with some connection of the Jihadists, Gudundi as his cows and wealth were more important to him than the sarauta, he left Maska to Kano. He stayed with his cattle for 5 years, grazing them around Godiya.

Gudundi was succeeded as sarkin Maska by his eldest son Jaji. Jaji like his father was not so keen about sarauta as he spent most of his time with his cattle and he was therefore dethroned. He moved with his cattle and family to settle in Zazzau. He was replaced as sarkin Maska by his younger brother Muhammadu Sani Dan Gudundi. Danejawa continued succeeding themselves as sarkin Maska up to the grandfather of engineer Zailani Tijjani. it was sarkin Katsina Dukko that seized the sarauta of Maska from Danejawa.

Danejawa were the title holders of Galadiman Katsina and one of the king makers. Galadima was based in Malumfashi as the district head. They have quarters in Birnin Katsina which is called Galadanci with Gidan Galadima as official residence.

The next write up will be on Dudi and his son Abdu who became the first Fulani Galadima of Katsina.

It has an area of 612 km and a population of 277,099 at the 2006 census.

The postal code of the area is 703.

References

Local Government Areas in Kano State